Matteo Maria Zuppi (born 11 October 1955) is an Italian prelate of the Catholic Church who has been Archbishop of Bologna since 12 December 2015. He was previously an auxiliary bishop of Rome from 2012 to 2015.

Pope Francis raised him to the rank of cardinal in 2019. He has been president of the Episcopal Conference of Italy since May 2022.

Priest
Born in Rome on 11 October 1955, he is the fifth of six children of the journalist Enrico and Carla Fumagalli, niece of Cardinal Carlo Confalonieri. He attended the Liceo Virgilio there and then he studied at the seminary in Palestrina and earned his Bachelor of Sacred Theology at the Pontifical Lateran University in Rome. He earned a laurea at the Sapienza University of Rome, writing his thesis on the history of Christianity. He was ordained a priest of the Diocese of Palestrina on 9 May 1981 and was appointed as the parochial vicar of Basilica of Santa Maria in Trastevere under Vincenzo Paglia, whom he succeeded as pastor of the church from 2000 to 2010. He was incardinated into the Archdiocese of Rome in 1988.

He worked with the Community of Sant'Egidio, a Catholic lay association devoted to ecumenism and conflict resolution. Zuppi was one of the four mediators of the two-year-long Rome-based peace negotiations that resulted in the Rome General Peace Accords and helped end the civil war in Mozambique in 1992, in recognition of which he was made an honorary citizen of that country. Zuppi also traveled to Turkey in 1993 in an attempt to secure the release of two Italian tourists held by Kurdish rebels.

Bishop and archbishop
On 31 January 2012, Pope Benedict XVI named him an Auxiliary Bishop of the Diocese of Rome and titular bishop of Villa Nova. He was ordained a bishop on 14 April 2012 by Cardinal Agostino Vallini, Vicar General of the Diocese of Rome. He was the auxiliary responsible for the city center, including the Trastevere neighborhood where Sant'Egidio is headquartered. There he led efforts to improve care for the poor and the elderly and developed outreach programs for drug addicts and gypsies. He also established relations with traditionalists and celebrated a Pontifical Mass according to the Tridentine rite.

Pope Francis appointed him Archbishop of Bologna on 27 October 2015.

In May 2018, he contributed an essay to the Italian translation of James Martin's Building a Bridge, Un ponte da costruire. He wrote that it was "useful for encouraging dialogue, as well as reciprocal knowledge and understanding, in view of a new pastoral attitude that we must seek together with our L.G.B.T. brothers and sisters" and that it will "help L.G.B.T. Catholics feel more at home in what is, after all, their church".

On 1 September 2019 Pope Francis announced that he planned to create Zuppi a cardinal on 5 October; he was the first head of an Italian see traditionally headed by a cardinal to be named a cardinal by Francis. On 5 October 2019, Pope Francis made him Cardinal-Priest of Sant'Egidio. He was made a member of the Dicastery for Promoting Integral Human Development on 21 February 2020, and a member of the Administration of the Patrimony of the Apostolic See on 18 April 2020.

On 14 January 2022, at the Basilica of St. Mary of the Angels and of the Martyrs in Rome, Zuppi presided over the state funeral of David Sassoli, his personal friend since adolescence and President of the European Parliament, who died on 11 January due to a multiple myeloma.

In June 2022 Cardinal Zuppi was accused of hiding what critics called blessing a gay couple after their civil wedding. The editor of an Italian newspaper said the Archdiocese of Bologna made a number of false claims in a statement attempting to justify the ceremony. The “blessing” of Pietro Morotti and Giacomo Spagnoli took place in the presence of six priests at the church of San Lorenzo di Budrio.

Publications

See also
Cardinals created by Francis

References

Additional sources 
 

Living people
20th-century Italian Roman Catholic priests
21st-century Italian cardinals
1955 births
Pontifical Lateran University alumni
Roman Catholic archbishops of Bologna
21st-century Italian Roman Catholic archbishops
Clergy from Rome
Cardinals created by Pope Francis